The Ministry of Public Security (French: Ministère de la Sécurité publique) is responsible for public safety and security in the province of Quebec. The ministry is in charge of the Sûreté du Québec, the provincial police force.

The current minister in charge is François Bornnadel.

Ministers of Public Security
 Herbert Marx 1988
 Gil Rémillard 1988-1989
 Sam Elkas 1989-1990
 Claude Ryan 1990-1994
 Robert Middlemiss 1994
 Serge Ménard 1994-1996
 Robert Perreault 1996-1997
 Pierre Bélanger 1997-1998
 Serge Ménard 1998-2003
 Normand Jutras 2002
 Jacques Chagnon 2003-2005
 Jacques P. Dupuis 2005-2010
 Robert Dutil 2010-2012
 Stéphane Bergeron 2012-2014
 Lise Thériault 2014-2016
 Martin Coiteux 2016-2018
 Geneviève Guilbault 2018-2022
François Bornnadel 2022-present

Solicitor General of Quebec
Prior to 2002, the ministry was under the Solicitor General (solliciteur général):
 George Irvine 1867-1873
 Joseph-Adolphe Chapleau 1873-1874
 Auguste-Real Angers 1874-1876
 George Barnard Baker 1876-1878
 Alexandre Chauveau 1878-1879
 Honoré Mercier 1879
 William Warren Lynch 1879-1881
 Edmund James Flynn 1884-1887
 Georges Duhamel 1887-1890
 Antoine Rivard 1950-1959
 Jacques Miquelon 1959-1960
 Claude Wagner 1964-1966
 Roy Fournier 1971-1972
 Fernand Lalonde 1975-1976
 Marc-André Bédard 1985
 Gerard Latulippe 1985-1987
 Herbert Marx 1987-1988

Provincial prisons in Quebec
 Centre de détention Montreal (Prison Bordeaux) - Montréal, Quebec
 Centre de détention Tanguay (Maison Tanguay) - Montréal, Quebec
 Centre de détention Rivière-des-prairies - Rivière-des-Prairies, Quebec
 Centre de détention St-Jerome - St-Jerome, Quebec
 Centre de détention Québec - Québec, Quebec
 Quartier cellulaire du Palais de Justice - Longueuil, Quebec
 Montréal Palais de Justice - Montréal, Quebec
 Centre de détention Laval - Laval, Quebec
 Centre de détention Amos - Amos, Quebec
 Centre de détention Baie-Comeau - Baie-Comeau, Quebec
 Centre de détention Chicoutimi - Saguenay, Quebec
 Centre de détention Havre-Aubert - Îles-de-la-Madeleine, Quebec
 Centre de détention Hull - Gatineau, Quebec
 Centre de détention New-Carlisle - New Carlisle, Quebec
 Centre de détention Rimouski - Rimouski, Quebec
 Centre de détention Percé - Percé, Quebec
 Centre de détention Roberval - Roberval, Quebec
 Centre de détention Sept-Îles - Sept-Îles, Quebec
 Centre de détention Sherbrooke - Sherbrooke, Quebec
 Centre de détention Sorel - Sorel-Tracy, Quebec
 Centre de détention Trois-Rivières - Trois-Rivières, Quebec
 Centre de détention Valleyfield - Valleyfield, Quebec

References

External links
 Official website

Public Security
Quebec
Solicitors general